Rashad Smith (born 31 July 1996), is a Bajan professional footballer who plays for the Barbados national football team.

Career statistics

International

References

External links
 
 Rashad Smith at Caribbean Football Database

1996 births
Living people
Association football defenders
Barbadian footballers
Barbados international footballers